Jarrod Firth (born 3 December 1991) is a New Zealand rugby union footballer who currently plays as a prop for Grenoble in the Top 14.

Rugby Union career

Amateur career

Firth played for Ardmore Marist in New Zealand.

On moving to Scotland, Firth has played for Stirling County and then Currie.

Professional career

He previously made two appearances for the  during the 2015 Super Rugby season while on an interim contract with the franchise.

On 3 February 2016 it was announced that Firth has signed for Glasgow Warriors on a -year deal, subject to the player receiving a visa.

He made his debut for the Warriors on 30 August 2016 against Canada A. It was his only appearance for the Warriors.

On 25 January 2017 it was announced that Firth had signed for French club Grenoble.

References

1991 births
Living people
New Zealand rugby union players
Rugby union props
Counties Manukau rugby union players
Chiefs (rugby union) players
Rugby union players from Auckland
People educated at Saint Kentigern College
Glasgow Warriors players
Stirling County RFC players
Currie RFC players
FC Grenoble players
Expatriate rugby union players in Scotland
Expatriate rugby union players in France
New Zealand expatriate sportspeople in Scotland
New Zealand expatriate sportspeople in France